The 1981–82 OJHL season was the 10th season of the Ontario Junior Hockey League (OJHL). The 11 teams of the league played a 50-game season. The top four teams of each division make the playoffs.

The winner of the OJHL playoffs, the Guelph Platers, won the OHA Buckland Cup and then the Dudley Hewitt Cup as Central Canadian champions. The Platers then defeated the Callaghan Cup champions from the Maritime Provinces to move on to the 1982 Centennial Cup.  The Platers lost the Centennial Cup for the national champions

Changes
League changes name to Ontario Junior Hockey League.
Team jumps to two division format.
Orillia Travelways join OJHL from CJBHL.
Belleville Bulls leave OJHL for OHL.
Wexford Raiders leave OJHL.

Final standings
Note: GP = Games played; W = Wins; L = Losses; OTL = Overtime losses; SL = Shootout losses; GF = Goals for; GA = Goals against; PTS = Points; x = clinched playoff berth; y = clinched division title; z = clinched conference title

1981-82 OJHL Playoffs

Quarter-final
Guelph Platers defeated North York Rangers 4-games-to-none
Dixie Beehives defeated Brampton Warriors 4-games-to-1
Markham Waxers defeated Aurora Tigers 4-games-to-1
Richmond Hill Rams defeated Newmarket Flyers 4-games-to-3
Semi-final
Guelph Platers defeated Richmond Hill Rams 4-games-to-none
Markham Waxers defeated Dixie Beehives 4-games-to-2
Final
Guelph Platers defeated Markham Waxers 4-games-to-1

OHA Buckland Cup Championship
The 1982 Buckland Cup was a best-of-5 series between the Onaping Falls Huskies (NOJHL) and the Guelph Platers. The winner moved on to the 1982 Dudley Hewitt Cup semi-final.

Guelph Platers defeated Onaping Falls Huskies 3-games-to-none
Guelph 6 - Onaping Falls 2
Guelph 8 - Onaping Falls 3
Guelph 6 - Onaping Falls 1

Dudley Hewitt Cup Championship
The 1982 Dudley Hewitt Cup was a four team playdown between the Guelph Platers, Thunder Bay Kings (TBHL), Pembroke Lumber Kings (CJHL), and La Prairie Flames (QJAHL). The winner moved on to the 1982 Eastern Centennial Cup championship.

Semi-final
Guelph Platers defeated Thunder Bay Kings (TBHL) 3-games-to-none
Guelph 7 - Thunder Bay 4
Guelph 5 - Thunder Bay 2
Guelph 7 - Thunder Bay 3
Final
Guelph Platers defeated Pembroke Lumber Kings (CJHL) 4-games-to-none
Guelph 3 - Pembroke 2
Guelph 10 - Pembroke 2
Guelph 6 - Pembroke 2
Guelph 7 - Pembroke 0

1982 Eastern Canada Championship
The 1982 Eastern Canada Centennial Cup championship was a best-of-7 series between the Moncton Hawks (NBJHL) and the Guelph Platers. The winner moved on to the 1982 Centennial Cup championship.

Guelph Platers defeated Moncton Hawks (NBJHL) 4-games-to-1
Guelph 8 - Moncton 2
Moncton 5 - Guelph 4
Guelph 13 - Moncton 4
Guelph 11 - Moncton 2
Guelph 14 - Moncton 4

1982 Centennial Cup Championship
The 1982 Centennial Cup was the best-of-7 Canadian National Junior A championship series between the Eastern Champion Guelph Platers and the Western Abbott Cup champion Prince Albert Raiders (SJHL).

Prince Albert Raiders (SJHL) defeated Guelph Platers 4-games-to-none
Prince Albert 9 - Guelph 4
Prince Albert 7 - Guelph 3
Prince Albert 6 - Guelph 3
Prince Albert 8 - Guelph 4

Leading Scorers

See also
 1982 Centennial Cup
 Dudley Hewitt Cup
 List of Ontario Hockey Association Junior A seasons
 Thunder Bay Junior A Hockey League
 Northern Ontario Junior Hockey League
 Central Junior A Hockey League
 Quebec Junior A Hockey League
 1981 in ice hockey
 1982 in ice hockey

References

External links
 Official website of the Ontario Junior Hockey League
 Official website of the Canadian Junior Hockey League

Ontario Junior Hockey League seasons
OPJHL